Greatest Hits & More may refer to:

 Greatest Hits & More (Helena Paparizou album), 2011 pop album
 Greatest Hits & More (The Who album), 2009 rock album
 Greatest Hits ... And More, a 2006 album by 10cc
 Greatest Hit...and More, a 2006 album by Reel Big Fish

See also
 Greatest Hits & More More More, 2007 album by Bananarama
 Greatest Hits (disambiguation)